Albert Vallci (born 2 July 1995) is an Austrian professional footballer who plays as a centre-back for Swiss Super League club St. Gallen.

Club career

Early career
Vallci at the age of 6, he started playing football in FC Lankowitz, where after eight years it was transferred to Kapfenberger SV. On 9 March 2013, he made his debut with Kapfenberger SV II in Matchday 16 of Austrian Regionalliga Central against Villacher SV after coming on as a substitute at 63rd minute in place of Michael Vollmann. After one year, Vallci made his debut on 13 May as professional footballer in a 1–0 away defeat against Liefering after being named in the starting line-up. In January 2015, he joined Austrian Regionalliga Central side SV Lafnitz.

SV Horn
On 10 June 2016, Vallci signed a two-year contract with Austrian Second League club SV Horn. On 16 July 2016, he made his debut with SV Horn in the 2016–17 Austrian Cup first round against FCM Traiskirchen after coming on as a substitute at 62nd minute in place of Milan Bortel.

Wacker Innsbruck
On 2 June 2017, Vallci signed a one-year contract with Austrian Second League club Wacker Innsbruck. On 19 September 2017, he made his debut with Wacker Innsbruck in the 2017–18 Austrian Cup second round against SKU Amstetten after being named in the starting line-up.

Red Bull Salzburg
On 18 January 2019, Vallci signed a three-year contract with Austrian Bundesliga club Red Bull Salzburg. On 21 February 2019, he made his debut with Red Bull Salzburg in the 2018–19 UEFA Europa League round of 32 against the Belgian side Club Brugge after coming on as a substitute at 77th minute in place of injured Marin Pongračić.

St. Gallen
On 4 August 2022, Vallci signed a three-year contract with Swiss Super League club St. Gallen and receiving squad number 20. Two days later, he was named as a St. Gallen substitute for the first time in a league match against Grasshoppers.

International career
On 28 May 2019, Vallci received a call-up from Austria for the UEFA Euro 2020 qualifying matches against Slovenia and North Macedonia, he was an unused substitute in these matches. In addition to Austria, he has the right to represent his father's homeland, Kosovo and his mother's homeland, Romania at the international level.

Personal life
Vallci was born in Voitsberg, Austria by Kosovo Albanian father from Mitrovica, and a Romanian mother.

Career statistics

Club

Honours
Red Bull Salzburg
Austrian Champion: 2019, 2020, 2021, 2022
Austrian Cup: 2019, 2020, 2021

References

External links

1995 births
Living people
People from Voitsberg
Footballers from Styria
Austrian footballers

Austrian expatriate footballers
Austrian expatriate sportspeople in Switzerland
Austrian people of Kosovan descent
Austrian people of Albanian descent
Austrian people of Romanian descent
Kosovan footballers
Kosovan expatriate footballers
Kosovan expatriate sportspeople in Switzerland
Association football fullbacks
Austrian Regionalliga players
SV Lafnitz players
2. Liga (Austria) players
Kapfenberger SV players
SV Horn players
Austrian Football Bundesliga players
FC Wacker Innsbruck (2002) players
FC Red Bull Salzburg players

FC St. Gallen players